The 1922 Purdue Boilermakers football team was an American football team that represented Purdue University during the 1922 Big Ten Conference football season. In their first season under head coach James Phelan, the Boilermakers compiled a 1–5–1 record, finished in last place in the Big Ten Conference with a 0–3–1 record against conference opponents, and were outscored by their opponents by a total of 126 to 36. Edgar E. Murphy was the team captain.

Schedule

References

Purdue
Purdue Boilermakers football seasons
Purdue Boilermakers football